is a Japanese former football player. His brother is Takuya Yoshikawa.

References

External links

1986 births
Living people
Hannan University alumni
Association football people from Shiga Prefecture
Japanese footballers
J2 League players
Japan Football League players
Ehime FC players
Kataller Toyama players
MIO Biwako Shiga players
Association football midfielders